Czarnieckiego or Czarneckiego Prison may refer to:

 Kraków-Podgórze Detention Centre in Kraków; unit of the Ministry of Justice (Poland), historic prison during Nazi German occupation of Poland
 Czarnieckiego (or Czarneckiego) Prison in Łódź within Ghetto Litzmannstadt, historic site no longer in existence, mentioned in World War II literature